Route 148 is a  south–north state highway in central Massachusetts. The road travels between U.S. Route 20 (US 20) in Sturbridge and Route 122 in Oakham. It travels entirely in Worcester County.

Route description

Route 148 begins at US 20 in Fiskdale, a village in Sturbridge. The highway runs north under Interstate 90 (the Massachusetts Turnpike) without an interchange and past the Tantasqua Regional High School before entering Brookfield, where there is a very brief concurrency with Route 9 in the center of the town. Route 148 then enters North Brookfield and becomes concurrent with Route 67 through the center of the town.

History
Route 148 was extended after 1986 from the southern intersection with Route 67 in North Brookfield to Route 122 in Oakham; however, signage for the highway north of Route 67 is very spotty.

Major intersections

References

External links

148
Transportation in Worcester County, Massachusetts